Ponikve Airport  is an airport in the western part of Serbia, located on the Ponikve plateau: 12 km (7.5 mi) northwest from the city of Užice. The airport boasts one of the longest runways in the Balkans, and the second longest in Serbia.

In the vicinity of the airport are some of the popular tourist attractions and ski resorts such as: Zlatibor, Tara and Mokra Gora.

History
Ponikve Airport was built in the period from 1979 to 1983, but until 1992, it wasn't used. In 1996 and 1997, Jat Airways, then known as JAT Yugoslav Airlines, served the airport twice a week for a domestic round line Užice - Belgrade - Tivat - Užice, with an ATR 72 turboprop aircraft. Operations ceased in 1998 as the number of passengers reduced greatly.

Ponikve airport has been heavily bombarded by NATO forces during the 1999 NATO bombing of Yugoslavia. This led to complete destruction of the runway and facilities for any civilian or military use.

On 21 October 2013, the Ponikve Airport greeted the first international civil flight - on the runway landed Cessna Citation CJ3 with two crew members and five-member delegation of businessmen from Brussels. Same day in the afternoon hours, Business jet went to Thessaloniki.

Recent developments

Since 2006, the process of reconstruction of the Ponikve Airport has begun. The runway reconstruction has been completed and as of 2016, it has  in length (around  reconstructed). Also, the new terminal building was built in 2016.

The airport, which boasts a new terminal building, was taken over by the state in 2018. In 2019, a 3,735 metre perimeter fence was erected, however, a further 5,195 metres are required. In addition, the final 800 metres of the 3,200 metres long runway must be resurfaced, and a lighting system installed. Some five million euros are necessary in order for the airport to be put into commercial use.

Airports of Serbia submitted a request to the Ministry of Transportation to decide on the need to prepare a study on environmental impact assessment of the project of phased reconstruction of Ponikve airport. As stated in the preliminary design, the reconstruction will be done in 5 phases, for critical aircraft Airbus A320neo and Boeing 757. The first and second phases include the rehabilitation of the runway, drainage system, cable ducts of the light marking system and horizontal and vertical signaling of part of the runway, for the critical Airbus A320 neo aircraft. The third phase includes the expansion of the turntable on the threshold of the 28 runway in order to create opportunities for turning the critical Boeing 757 aircraft. The subject of the project of phase 4 is the construction of a new taxiway 23 m wide and the construction of a platform, and in the fifth phase the reconstruction of the protective belt at the end of the runway will be done for the critical Boeing 757 aircraft.

Airlines and destinations
As of 10 January 2023, there are no regular commercial passenger flights to/from Ponikve Airport.

Statistics

The passenger numbers are from general aviation operations, both domestically and international.

See also
 List of airports in Serbia
 Airports of Serbia
 Transport in Serbia
 AirSerbia

References

External links

 Official website
 AERODROM PONIKVE - PROŠLOST I SADAŠNJOST 

Airports in Serbia
Užice
Yugoslav Air Force bases